Juan Risso (born 3 September 1942) is an Argentine former footballer who competed in the 1964 Summer Olympics.

Risso spent three seasons in France with Ligue 1 side AC Ajaccio, where he scored seven goals in 88 league matches.

References

External links
Juan Risso at BDFA.com.ar

1942 births
Living people
Association football midfielders
Argentine footballers
Olympic footballers of Argentina
Footballers at the 1964 Summer Olympics
Club de Gimnasia y Esgrima La Plata footballers
AC Ajaccio players
Sportspeople from Buenos Aires Province